The Shire of Glenelg was a local government area about  west of Melbourne, the state capital of Victoria, Australia.

History

Glenelg was first incorporated as a road district on 2 September 1863, and became a shire on 30 June 1864.

On 23 September 1994, the Shire of Glenelg was abolished, and along with the City of Portland and parts of the Shire of Heywood, was merged into the new Shire of Glenelg.

Ridings
Glenelg was not subdivided into ridings, and its 12 councillors represented the entire shire.

Towns and localities
 Casterton*
 Chetwynd
 Dergholm
 Henty
 Merino
 Paschendale
 Poolaijelo
 Sandford
 Strathdownie
 Wando Vale

* Council seat.

Population

* Estimate in the 1958 Victorian Year Book.

References

External links
 Victorian Places - Glenelg Shire

Glenelg